Balsamorhiza hookeri (Hooker's balsamroot) is a North American species of perennial plant in the family Asteraceae. It grows in the Great Basin and neighboring regions in the Western United States. It is found in Washington, Oregon, California, Idaho, Nevada, Utah, and Arizona.

Description
The leaves are compound pinnate, with the leaflet divisions also divided or deeply lobed.
There may be one to several stems, which are leafless and hairy, and topped by one flower each.

It blooms from April to July.

Distribution and habitat

Ecology
It tends to grow in rockier habitats than its cousin, arrow-leaf balsamroot (Balsamorhiza sagittata). It hybridizes with arrow-leaf balsamroot, which has arrow shaped leaves. The result is a plant with leaves that are arrow shaped, but also deeply divided.

References

External links
 

hookeri
Flora of the Western United States
Plants described in 1840
Flora without expected TNC conservation status